The 1975 Florida State Seminoles football team represented Florida State University in the 1975 NCAA Division I football season.

Schedule

References

Florida State
Florida State Seminoles football seasons
Florida State Seminoles football